James Cassidy may refer to:

 James Cassidy (musician), American bass and keyboard player
 James Edwin Cassidy (1869–1951), American Roman Catholic bishop in Massachusetts
 James H. Cassidy (1869–1926), United States Representative from Ohio
 Jamie Cassidy, English former footballer
 James M. Cassidy, American horse trainer
 Jim Cassidy (jockey) (born 1963), New Zealand jockey

See also
 Jim Cassidy (disambiguation)